The Dangerous Game (Norwegian: Den farlige leken) is a 1942 Norwegian comedy film directed by Tancred Ibsen, starring Lauritz Falk, Nanna Stenersen and Per Aabel. The film is based on Alex Brinchmann's successful stage comedy "Karusell" ("Merry-go-round"). The sociable Jean Blom (Falk) feels held back by his boring wife (Stenersen). He gives her an injection to make her more lively, but the plan fails.

External links
 
 

1942 films
1942 comedy films
Films directed by Tancred Ibsen
Norwegian comedy films
Norwegian black-and-white films
1940s Norwegian-language films